Pristimantis pruinatus is a species of frog in the family Strabomantidae. It is endemic to Venezuela and only known from its type locality, the summit of Cerro Yaví ( above sea level), a sandstone table-top mountain (tepui) in the Amazonas State. The specific name pruinatus refers to the frosted appearance of this frog when alive and is derived from the Latin pruina (="frost") and -atus (="pertaining to").

Description
The body is uniformly blackish with fine, silvery frosting dorsally. The dorsum has granular skin; ventral skin is coarsely areolate. The tympanum is small. The snout is rounded. The upper eyelids have small flat warts. The fingers and toes lack webbing.

Habitat and conservation
It has been collected on low vegetation and in a small cave in montane tepui forest. It is nocturnal. No threats to this species are known.

References

pruinatus
Amphibians of Venezuela
Endemic fauna of Venezuela
Taxa named by Charles W. Myers
Taxa named by Maureen Ann Donnelly
Amphibians described in 1996
Taxonomy articles created by Polbot
Amphibians of the Tepuis